The 5th BRDC International Trophy meeting was held on 9 May 1953 at the Silverstone Circuit, Northamptonshire. The race was run to Formula Two regulations, and was held over two heats of 15 laps each, followed by a final race of 35 laps. Mike Hawthorn, driving a Ferrari 500 won the final and shared fastest lap with Emmanuel de Graffenried. de Graffenried was the fastest qualifier.

Results

Final – 35 Laps

 Fastest lap: Emmanuel de Graffenried/Mike Hawthorn – 1:51

Heats – 15 Laps

References

BRDC International Trophy
BRDC International Trophy
BRDC International Trophy
BRDC International Trophy